The 1981 AIAW women's college slow-pitch softball championship was held near Raleigh, North Carolina on May 14–16. Thirteen college softball teams met in the first AIAW national slow-pitch softball tournament. The AIAW conducted only two slow-pitch softball national championships, in 1981 and 1982, as the NCAA sought to and eventually did vanquish the women's collegiate athletic organization.

Teams
The double-elimination tournament included 13 teams seeded in the following order:

 Florida State
 East Carolina
 North Carolina
 South Florida
 North Carolina State
 Auburn
 Florida
 Wilmington College (Ohio)
 Western Carolina
 Northern Kentucky
 Georgia Southern
 Morehead State (Kentucky)
 Lakeland Community College (Ohio)

Top-seeded Florida State was the victor in the tournament, winning all four of its games. The team eliminated North Carolina in the final, 4-1, and placed  five players on the all-tournament team. Darby Cottle was voted the Most Valuable Player of the tournament. The Lady Seminoles won 16 consecutive games to finish out the season with a record of 54-7. JoAnne Graf, who went on to have a legendary career at the university, coached the team to Florida State's first softball national championship.

Bracket

Source:

Ranking

See also
 AIAW Champions#Slowpitch Softball
 1982 AIAW slow-pitch softball tournament
 1983 National Collegiate slow-pitch softball championship

References

1981 AIAW Division I softball season
College softball championships